The Mosque of Khushqadam El-Ahmadi is on El-Seyufia Street in Cairo and was built in 1366. The building was originally the palace of Emir Tashtimur. The building became a mosque in the late 15th century. In 1498, the eunuch Amir Khushqadam El-Ahmadi was stripped of his wealth and rank and exiled to Sudan, where he died.

References

External links
 Information about Mosque of Khushqadam El-Ahmadi
 

Buildings and structures completed in 1366
Houses completed in the 14th century
15th-century mosques
Palaces in Cairo
Mamluk architecture
Mosques in Cairo